Pitsa may refer to:

The Pitsa panels, the earliest surviving example of Greek panel painting
, a cargo ship which sank in 1967
Pitsa, the Southern Sotho equivalent to English "pot" or "pan".
Pizza

See also 

Pita
Pisa